The Cabinet of Uruguay  is part of the executive branch of the Government of Uruguay. It is composed of thirteen cabinet ministers. Each is appointed by the President of Uruguay, and serves as the head of a particular executive department. It meets on Monday mornings at the Executive Tower of Montevideo, but sometimes meets at the Suarez Residence or at the Anchorena Presidential Estate.

Currently, the cabinet is formed by an electoral alliance, the Coalición Multicolor, under the administration of Luis Alberto Lacalle Pou. Cabinet ministers were sworn in on March 1, 2020, the same day the president took office.

Members of the Council of Ministers

References 

Government of Uruguay
Uruguay